Auffret is a surname. Notable people with the surname include:

 , French singer and harpist
 Benjamin Auffret (born 1995), French diver
  (1929–2001), French sculptor
 Frank Auffret (born 1950), British motorcycle speedway rider
 , French film director and screenwriter
 , French writer

See also
 Auffray
 Aufray

Surnames of Breton origin